Vermont Quilt Festival is an annual event, which is both the oldest and largest quilting event in the region. Featuring a weekend of quilt exhibits, contest quilts, classes taught by renowned quiltmakers, a champagne preview, vendors, lectures and appraisals, the festival is well attended by both beginner and expert quilters alike.

History
In 1977, the Festival started as a one-day show featuring  both antique and new quilts. The following year contest quilts were added  and by 1981 the Festival included classes and also appraisals of antique quilts.

Originally held in Northfield, Vermont, the annual event took place on the Norwich University campus until 2006. The Festival moved its venue to the Champlain Valley Expo in Essex Junction, Vermont with classes held at the neighboring Saint Michael's College in Colchester, Vermont where it continues to be held yearly on the last weekend in June, except 2020 when it was cancelled due to COVID-19 pandemic concerns. 2021 sees a virtual festival.

The Vermont Quilt Festival, Inc., a non-profit organization, has completed  years.

Notable facts
The Festival opens with a festive Champagne and Chocolate Preview each year which has been attended by the Governor of Vermont.

Yankee Magazine, Quilter's Newsletter Magazine, Vermont Life, The New York Times, Boston Globe, USA Today and Quilt Mania (France) as well as local media are just some of the publications that have covered the event.

It is consistently designated as a Top Ten Summer event by the Vermont Chamber of Commerce, and as one of the Top 100 Events by The American Bus Association.

References

External links
 Vermont Quilt Festival - official site
 Champlain Valley Exposition
 St. Michael's College

Festivals in Vermont
Quilting